Luis is an American sitcom starring Luis Guzmán that aired on Fox from September 19 to October 17, 2003. Scheduled in the Friday night death slot, the series received low ratings and was canceled after four episodes. The series was the first show of the 2003-04 season to be canceled.

Cast
Luis Guzmán as Luis
Charlie Day as Richie
Reggie Lee as Zhing Zhang
Wes Ramsey as Greg
Jaclyn DeSantis as Marly
Diana-Maria Riva as Isabella

Episodes

Reception
TV Guide wrote of the series: "As tasteless as week-old crullers, Luis is a melting pot of cringe-inducing Ethnic cliches."

References

External links
 

2000s American sitcoms
2003 American television series debuts
2003 American television series endings
English-language television shows
Fox Broadcasting Company original programming
Television series by 20th Century Fox Television
Television shows set in New York City
Latino sitcoms